The 3 Sounds is an album by American pianist Gene Harris recorded in 1971 and released on the Blue Note label. Although it is titled after Harris' group The Three Sounds, the album is a transitional effort. Carl Burnett, the drummer from The Three Sounds, is present. Making his first appearance with Harris is bassist Luther Hughes, who would become the regular bassist of the Gene Harris Quartet in the 1990s.

Reception
The Allmusic review awarded the album 3 stars.

Track listing

Recorded at United Artists Studios, West Hollywood, California on July 26 (tracks 1-3, 6 & 8), July 27 (tracks 4 & 5) and August 3 (track 7), 1971.

Personnel
Gene Harris - piano
Monk Higgins - organ, arranger
Fred Robinson, Albert Vescovo - guitar
Luther Hughes - electric bass
Carl Burnett - drums
Bobbye Porter Hall - conga
Paul Humphrey - percussion
Unidentified vocals

References

Blue Note Records albums
Gene Harris albums
1971 albums
Albums produced by George Butler (record producer)